The white-rumped triller (Lalage leucopygialis) is a species of bird in the family Campephagidae. It is endemic to Sulawesi in Indonesia. Its natural habitats are subtropical or tropical moist lowland forest and subtropical or tropical mangrove forest.

References

white-rumped triller
Endemic birds of Sulawesi
white-rumped triller
Taxonomy articles created by Polbot